Gholamreza Rahimi (born 23 July 1978) is an Iranian Paralympic archer.

In the 2016 Summer Paralympics, his debut games, Rahimi won his first Paralympic medal which was gold.

References

Paralympic archers of Iran
Archers at the 2016 Summer Paralympics
Paralympic gold medalists for Iran
Living people
Iranian male archers
1978 births
Medalists at the 2016 Summer Paralympics
Paralympic medalists in archery
Islamic Solidarity Games competitors for Iran
Islamic Solidarity Games medalists in archery
21st-century Iranian people